Guajome Park Academy  (commonly referred to as Guajome or GPA) is a K–12 public charter school in Vista, California, United States that was established in 1994. It offers the IB Diploma Programme for eleventh- and twelfth-graders. During the 2004-2005 school year, 1,238 students were enrolled: 530 in the middle school and 708 in the high school.

The school is named after nearby Guajome County Park. The name "Guajome" comes from the Luiseño Indian word wakhavumi meaning "frog pond". In the Luiseño story of creation, Wahawut was one of the "First People" who took on the appearance of a frog to cast a spell over the god Oiyot; consequently, the school's mascot is a frog.

History
Guajome Park Academy was founded in 1994 by a group of parents and educators headed by "C.E.O." (Chief Educational Officer) Sandra Williamson (later Sandra Williamson-Angle). In its first year, Guajome had no campus of its own, and met at a nearby middle school as well as at Vista High School. Although only barely established, Guajome was in fact, one of the first charter schools in California, a distinction it proudly holds to this day. The following year, a campus in northern Vista was opened, featuring temporary buildings, the much-loved "trailers." In 1997, the school opened a secondary campus in downtown Vista called the Vista Village Learning Plaza, which at various times has housed the high school program and an alternative education program called the Expeditionary Learning Center (ELC). In 2004, after nearly ten years of waiting, a permanent campus opened at the main campus site, with two-story buildings, a gymnasium, and an amphitheater, facilities the school had not had in any of its previous locations. Soon after, the Vista Village Learning Plaza was closed and the ELC was relocated to the main campus.

Although Guajome has never been a private school, in its early years prospective students and their parents were required to interview with the dean. As the school's population increased, such interviews became less feasible and were eventually discontinued. In recent years, especially following administrative changes in 2003, there has been increasing controversy surrounding what some critics say is a break from the school's original vision of small classroom sizes and a project-based, integrated curriculum. In 2005, a former teacher created the message board Guajome Underground to criticize the administration and discuss educational changes at the school.

Campus
The current campus is located near the northern border of Vista, at the intersection of North Santa Fe and Museum Way. It is within walking distance of the Antique Gas and Steam Engine Museum, Rancho Guajome Adobe, and Guajome County Park; students often take field trips to these locations, and the high school graduations were held at the adobe until the completion of the current campus. The school itself has three two-story buildings, a one-story building, a gymnasium, an amphitheater, and used to have a ropes course, the latter of which is also rented out to other organizations.

Extracurricular activities
Guajome's athletic teams include soccer, cross country, track, softball, baseball, basketball, volleyball,tennis and wrestling. The soccer, cross country and wrestling teams have received high awards, performing competitively in League and CIF honors as teams, with numerous individual athletes also earning recognition. The school also participates annually in the North County Academic League and has had some very limited participation in Science Olympiad.

In addition to its athletic teams, the school also has a growing theater program (with numerous hit plays directed by the talented and popular Paul Canaletti); as well as chapters of the International Thespian Society, Key Club International (with students assuming leadership roles Division and District-wide), California Scholarship Federation and a large and active Associated Student Body (ASB). Notably, the Guajome Park Academy Yearbook has won 1st (2008), 2nd (2006, 2010, 2011) and 3rd (2007) place ribbons at the San Diego County Fair.

Other extracurricular in arts have dwindled over the years, but are on the rise again. The High School and Middle School have a drumline founded by Dan Amaya and formerly headed up by Dr. David Whitman, who is also percussion faculty at San Diego State University. GPA participates annually in the five Drums Across California competitions held annually in the Los Angeles area. In 2013, GPA Drumline won the championship at Drums Across California in the Junior Division. GPA Drumline has gone on to win titles again in 2014, 2016, 2018, and 2019. In the fall of 2014, Guajome added string orchestra and choral programs during the school day. Currently, there is no band at Guajome.

Guajome is a member of the German American Partnership Program and has been partnered with its sister school, Gymnasium Ulricianum Aurich, in Aurich, Lower Saxony, Germany since 1995. This is an exchange program that allows students to thrive in languages. Most of these trips consist with a 3 week stay over summer offered for students in 10th grade or above and then the option of staying for a whole semester.

After years of having little success in the North County Academic League, Guajome's 2012-2013 Freshman team went 6-0 for the first time in the school's history and entered the playoffs against Del Norte High School, where they fell 48-41. Del Norte went on to win the championship against La Costa Canyon High School, 77-36. Guajome remains hopeful that their Freshman team's success will carry into the 2013-2014 Junior Varsity season.

In popular culture
The film To Save a Life was partially filmed at Guajome Park Academy.  The school's exterior was used for exterior shots, while the interior shots were of Oceanside High School.

Notable alumni
 Vanessa Hudgens, actress and singer - attended for sixth and seventh grade in 2001.

References

  California Department of Education student enrollment report
  "Guajome Park Academy lauded for campus design" by Stacy Brandt, North County Times, January 5, 2006, retrieved January 24, 2006
  "Changes at Guajome Academy ripple onto Web" by Rob O'Dell, July 16, 2005, retrieved December 26, 2008]
  "To Save a Life - imdb.com reference Retrieved November 22, 2009

External links
 
 Guajome ASB – the school's ASB website

Charter K-12 schools in California
International Baccalaureate schools in California
High schools in San Diego County, California
Vista, California
Educational institutions established in 1994
1994 establishments in California